2-Octyl cyanoacrylate is a cyanoacrylate ester typically used as a wound closure adhesive (under the brand name Dermabond).  It is closely related to octyl cyanoacrylate. The use of 2-octyl cyanoacrylate was approved in 1998; offered as an alternative to stitches, sutures, and or adhesive strips.

Adhesion mechanism 
When the 2-octyl cyanoacrylate monomers are exposed to anions, provided either by moisture from the skin or exudate they quickly polymerize causing an exothermic reaction binding to the most superficial layer of epithelium. The seal formed by the cyanoacrylate is water tight allowing for the wound to heal uninterrupted.

Anti-microbial properties 
Anti-microbial properties have been observed against gram-positive and non-pseudomonas gram-negative bacteria, but are not fully understood. it is believed that the interaction between the positively charged bacterial capsule and the negatively charged 8-octyl cyanoacrylate destabilizes the cell capsule of the bacteria killing it.

References

See also
 Methyl cyanoacrylate
 Ethyl cyanoacrylate
 Butyl cyanoacrylate
 Octyl cyanoacrylate

Cyanoacrylate esters
Monomers